The Eglinton West line was a proposed east–west subway line in Toronto, Ontario, Canada, whose construction began in 1994 but was cancelled in 1995. It was to start from the existing Eglinton West station on the Toronto Transit Commission's Yonge–University–Spadina line, travel underneath Eglinton Avenue West, and terminate at Black Creek Drive in its initial phase.

City of York mayor Fergy Brown, Metro Toronto chairman Alan Tonks, Ontario premier Bob Rae, Ontario minister of Transportation Gilles Pouliot, and TTC chair Mike Colle broke ground on the project in a ceremony on August 25, 1994, at Eglinton Avenue and Black Creek Drive; however, work was halted in 1995 after Mike Harris and the Progressive Conservative Party of Ontario won the 1995 Ontario general election and cancelled the project. The excavation under Eglinton West intended to be Allen station was subsequently filled in.

Planning history
In 1985, TTC's expansion planning report entitled Network 2011 proposed the Eglinton West line as a busway, not a subway. The busway would be the most cost-effective alternative since Eglinton West corridor sits in the vacant Richview Expressway corridor, though in the future it could be expanded to a subway if ridership warranted.

Though the cities of Etobicoke and York strongly supported the concept of an Eglinton rapid transit line, as did the Region of Peel, they were unsatisfied with the prospect of a busway. There was some political jealousy over the fact that North York had made the Sheppard subway a priority and Etobicoke and York argued that their transportation needs had similar importance. In 1986, the 2011 Network plan was initiated, with the Eglinton West corridor as a subway. On Metro Council, Etobicoke and York formed an alliance that argued that the Eglinton rapid transit line be built as a subway from the start. In 1994, when Premier Bob Rae agreed to fund the subway projects, they decided to spread the funding throughout Metro Toronto to appease residents of both sides, which would have resulted in two truncated subway lines instead of a single complete line at least initially.

The line was cancelled upon the election of Progressive Conservative Mike Harris in 1995, and the TTC shifted its expansion priorities away from Eglinton West to projects such as extending the Spadina subway to York University and Steeles Avenue, the completion of the Sheppard subway to Victoria Park Avenue and Scarborough City Centre, and improvements to major bus and streetcar routes to create a network of "surface rapid transit" routes (including on Eglinton Avenue).

Eglinton Crosstown plan

The TTC's Transit City plan, which was announced in 2007, included a light rail transit line across Eglinton called the Eglinton Crosstown LRT. This line would be built underground between approximately Keele Street and Laird Drive, which would effectively create an Eglinton West "subway", but would use LRT vehicles rather than the subway trains. A leaked copy of a Metrolinx report in 2008 indicated the organization may wish to revive the Eglinton subway line as opposed to the light rail option; however, in April 2009, the province and the city agreed on funding to build this as an LRT line.

Mayor Rob Ford announced the cancellation of Transit City on the day he took office in 2010. Transit City, including the Eglinton Crosstown line, was then reinstated along with a Finch LRT line and Sheppard LRT by Toronto City Council, over Mayor Rob Ford's objections. This was announced by Metrolinx four months later, with the support of Ontario Premier Dalton McGuinty. This line is to be underground for most its length, except at its ends in Scarborough and Etobicoke. It will mean the construction of an LRT line that will function like a Toronto subway line along a longer distance than the original Eglinton West subway line.

Proposed stations
The cancelled Eglinton West subway would only have been built as far as York Centre station. Allen, Keele North and York Centre would have had bus connections and the remaining stations would have had on-street connections only. These stations would have served mixed commercial and residential neighbourhoods (corresponding Line 5 Eglinton stations linked in parentheses):

 Eglinton West–Allen
 Dufferin North
 Caledonia
 Keele North / Trethewey
 York Centre

The expanded line would have served a suburban residential area and included six stations between Jane and Martin Grove. Continuing west, the line would have split into two branches to serve commercial–industrial areas near the airport. One branch would have diverted to Dixon Road and terminated at Carlingview, while the other would have stayed on Eglinton Avenue to Renforth. Stations on this line would likely have had bus connections available:

 Jane North
 Scarlett
 Royal York North
 Islington North
 Kipling North
 Martin Grove
 Attwell–Skyway (Dixon Road branch)
 Carlingview (Dixon Road branch)
 Renforth (Eglinton Avenue branch)

Allen station
Also known as Lower Eglinton West, this station was only a partial tunnel that was filled in shortly after the line's cancellation.

See also
 Line 5 Eglinton
 Queen subway line

References

External links
 The Eglinton West Subway Line

Abandoned rapid transit stations
Proposed Toronto rapid transit projects
Cancelled rapid transit lines and systems
Cancelled projects in Canada